31 Squadron or 31st Squadron may refer to:

 No. 31 Squadron RAAF, Royal Australian Air Force
 31st Squadron (Belgium), Belgian Air Force
 No. 31 Squadron (Finland)
 No. 31 Squadron RAF, United Kingdom Royal Air Force
 31st Training Squadron (JASDF), Japanese Air Self-Defense Force
 31st Airlift Squadron, United States Air Force
 31st Combat Communications Squadron, United States Air Force
 31st Rescue Squadron, United States Air Force
 31st Reconnaissance Squadron (disambiguation), several units of the United States Air Force
 31st Tactical Training Squadron, United States Air Force
 31st Test and Evaluation Squadron, United States Air Force
 VFA-31 (Strike Fighter Squadron 31), United States Navy
 Marine Aviation Logistics Squadron 31, United States Marine Corps

See also
 31st Division (disambiguation)
 31st Group (disambiguation)
 31st Brigade (disambiguation)
 31st Regiment (disambiguation)
 31st Battalion (disambiguation)